Keita de Castro (born May 23, 1981) is an Antiguan and Barbudan footballer who played for Antigua Barracuda FC in the USL Professional Division.

Club career
de Castro began his career in 2003 with Empire FC, helping his club finish fourth in the Antigua and Barbuda Premier Division, but he only lasted one season with the team. After being without a club for five years, de Castro signed with All Saints United in 2008, and spent three seasons there.

In 2011 de Castro transferred to the new Antigua Barracuda FC team prior to its first season in the USL Professional Division. He made his debut for the Barracudas on April 27, 2011 in a 7–0 victory over Puerto Rico United.

International career
de Castro made his debut for the Antigua and Barbuda national team in 2008, and has since gone on to make nine appearances for his country. He was part of the Antigua squad which took part in the final stages of the 2010 Caribbean Championship.

References

External links
 

1981 births
Living people
Antigua and Barbuda footballers
Antigua and Barbuda international footballers
Antigua Barracuda F.C. players
Association football goalkeepers
USL Championship players